Wetheron is a rural town and locality in the North Burnett Region, Queensland, Australia.

Geography 
The Mungar Junction to Monto Branch Railway passes through Wetheron. The town was served by the Wetheron railway station

A report by R. W. Winks of the Department of Agriculture, Brisbane, surveying for the proposed Degilbo to Gayndah railway line extension, dated 10 November 1897 stated:- "The first really good piece of country of any extent begins some little distance from the coach stage at Wetheron, Two Mile, extending beyond the head station and running thence in a south-westerly direction to Oakey Creek. It is principally composed of fine, black and chocolate soil ridges, even in contour, and in many places lightly timbered with broad-leafed ironbark and a kind of bloodwood. In some parts there is scarcely any timber, from which fact a portion of this zone is known locally as the Wetheron Clear Lands. Want of water is the chief drawback, but from some wells I saw on what was once group property, it would appear that good water can be obtained by comparatively shallow sinking.

History 
European settlement in the Wetheron area began in 1845, when William Humphreys and Henry Arthur Herbert took up a run of crown land on the south bank of the Burnett River. This was transferred to William Humphreys solely in 1851, along with the Ginoondam run. When Humphreys advertised the station for sale in 1857 the head station was described as consisting "of a comfortable verandah house, shingled, and containing 4 rooms and pantry, a kitchen, store, and meat store, overseer's house, shingled; woolshed, fitted with yards, shearer's house, shingled; two labourer's huts; a good two rail horse paddock; small cultivation paddock (3 rail); garden, stockyard, milking yard, pigsties, etc. There are seven out stations, with substantial huts, and yards or hurdles at each of them."

The partnership of Hon. Berkeley Basil Moreton and Osmond de Preaux Brock acquired the Station. Berkeley Moreton's brother Seymour Moreton replaced Brock in 1861.

The co-operative groups of Bon Accord, Byrnestown and Resolute settled on sites on a Wetheron run resumption in 1894.

In 1905 more parts of Wetheron were being opened up as agricultural farms and unconditional selections, and in 1908 the leasehold expired.  In 1905 when the Wetheron Railway Station and the line to Maryborough opened the township consisted of a newly-built hotel, kept by Mr. A. A. Morgan, and a fruit shop and general store.  The Mungar Junction to Monto railway line opened between Wetheron to Gayndah on 16 December 1907.

Wetheron State School opened on 24 January 1916. It closed on 31 December 1963.

In November 1925, the Anglican Archdiocese of Brisbane provided a loan of £150 to establish a church in Wetheron. Mrs Helen Gray donated a quarter-acre of land and a parish hall was erected by George James Bellert. The hall was officially opened on 5 May 1926. St John's Anglican Church was dedicated on 11 December 1927 by Venerable William Powning Glover, Archdeacon of Toowoomba. It is now closed.

Sefton Provisional School opened on 1925 and closed on 1926.

Education 
There are no schools in Wetheron. The nearest primary schools are Gayndah State School in neighbouring Gayndah to the south-west and Coalstoun Lakes State School in Coalstoun Lakes to the south-east. The nearest secondary school is Burnett State College in Gayndah.

References

External links 
 

Towns in Queensland
North Burnett Region
Localities in Queensland